Matthias-Grünewald-Gymnasium is a secondary school (gymnasium) in Würzburg, Germany.

History
The school was given its current name in 1965.

Notable alumni
 Claus Kühnl

References

External links
Matthias-Grünewald-Gymnasium 

Würzburg
Matthias Grünewald
Schools in Bavaria